This is a list of electoral results for the electoral district of Goulburn in Victorian state elections.

Members for Goulburn

Election results

Elections in the 1950s

Elections in the 1940s

References

Victoria (Australia) state electoral results by district